Bateman 365 is a project initiated by Scott Bateman in August 2005 to emulate the idea presented by the 24 Hour Animation Contest on the scale of one year. It utilizes a number of characters Bateman developed for his syndicated political cartoons and other works, as well as snippets from life in New York City and audio commentaries from third parties.

Recurring characters (usually voiced by Scott Bateman) 
Blind Mango Jehosophat: a satirization of Blind Willie McTell and Blind Lemon Jefferson.
Bobo the Bear: a "cute", nihilistic bear.
Bob the Damn Bunny: a lewd bunny rabbit.
Scurvy Steve, Pirate Accountant

Real life voices and subject sources 
George W. Bush: a number of speeches by Bush are satirized.
Colleen AF Venable
Laura Krafft
Terry Bain

Website 
 Bateman 365

American political satire
Mass media in New York City